Josef Schuster (born 20 March 1954) is a German physician and since November 2014 President of the Central Council of Jews in Germany (Zentralrat der Juden in Deutschland).

Biography 

Josef Schuster was born in Haifa in 1954. His paternal family had lived in Franconia since at least the middle of the 16th century. His father David Schuster was a merchant who was forced to emigrate to Palestine in 1938. Both parents of his mother were murdered at the Auschwitz concentration camp. His family returned to Germany in 1956. Schuster went to school in Würzburg and studied medicine at the Julius-Maximilians-Universität Würzburg. He became a specialist in internal medicine after training at the Juliusspital. Since 1988, he has maintained a private practice in internal medicine in Würzburg.

Schuster is a volunteer as an emergency physician for the Bavarian section of the German Red Cross. He is a member of the Bavarian Bioethics Commission and the central institutional review board of the German Medical Association.

Functions in Jewish Organizations 
In 1998, Schuster became President of the Jewish Community in Würzburg, a position his father had held between 1958 and 1996. Four years later, he was elected to be President of the Organization of Jewish Communities in Bavaria. In 2010, he became the vice-president of the Central Council of Jews in Germany. When Dieter Graumann stepped down as President of the Central Council, his election on November 30, 2014, as the successor was uncontested.

Other activities
 University of Würzburg, Member of the Board of Trustees
 German Coordinating-Council for Christian-Jewish Cooperation Organizations, Member of the Board of Trustees
 Deutsche Nationalstiftung, Member of the Senate

Writings 
 Zur Sterblichkeit jüdischer und nichtjüdischer Säuglinge. Dissertation Würzburg, University, 1980.

Literature 
 Caroline Mayer: "Ich wünsche mir Normalität für die jüdischen Gemeinden in Deutschland", KVB-Forum, Nr. 11, 2012, S. 26-27, Online (2 pages, in German pdf)

External links 
 Josef Schuster auf Wuerzburgwiki.de

References 

German emergency physicians
German Jews
Israeli Jews
1954 births
Living people
Physicians from Haifa
University of Würzburg alumni
Israeli emigrants to Germany
Officers Crosses of the Order of Merit of the Federal Republic of Germany